Tommy "Two-Gun" Adkisson is an American professional Foosball player. He is a multiple world champion. In particular, Adkisson "won 8 major titles during the 1990s", and placed well in several tournaments in the 2007 season.

See also
 List of world table football champions

References

 Profile at tablesoccer.org
 Profile at FoosWorld.com

Living people
World champions in table football
Year of birth missing (living people)